The 1991 World Orienteering Championships, the 14th World Orienteering Championships, were held in Mariánské Lázně, Czechoslovakia, 21–25 August 1991.

The championships had six events; the classic distance (formerly called individual) for men and women, the short distance for men and women, and relays for men and women.

Medalists

References 

World Orienteering Championships
1991 in Czechoslovak sport
International sports competitions hosted by Czechoslovakia
August 1991 sports events in Europe
Orienteering in Europe
Mariánské Lázně